The following lists events that happened during 2016 in Cambodia.

Incumbents 
 Monarch: Norodom Sihamoni 
 Prime Minister: Hun Sen

Events

Deaths

References

 
2010s in Cambodia
Years of the 21st century in Cambodia
Cambodia
Cambodia